

General classification

References

Giro di Lombardia
Giro di Lombardia
Giro di Lombardia
Giro di Lombardia